Daniel Asbury Mixon (born August 19, 1949) is an American jazz pianist.

Mixon was born in Harlem, New York City. He gained some attention in the 1970s and continues to record and play in New York and abroad. He started off as a tap dancer, attending the Ruth Williams Dance Studio. Later, he attended the High School of Performing Arts with Dance as his major but soon switched to playing the piano after being inspired by visits with his grandfather to see jazz artists playing at the Apollo Theater.

In 1966, at the age of 17, Mixon was invited to play with the trumpet player Sam Brown's band backing Patti LaBelle & the Blue Bells in Atlantic City at Reggie's Cocktail Lounge. After working with Joe Lee Wilson from 1967 to 1970, Mixon started to play regularly with Betty Carter during the years 1971–72.

He formed his own jazz trio, recorded with the Piano Choir and worked with a variety of important jazz musicians including Kenny Dorham, Cecil Payne, Art Blakey's Jazz Messengers, Frank Foster, Grant Green, Pharoah Sanders (1975), Joe Williams (jazz singer), Eddie Jefferson and Dee Dee Bridgewater.

1976 saw Mixon playing in Charles Mingus' band. He then played with Dannie Richmond in the late 1970s, toured the U.S. with Yusef Lateef and played a few years with the Lionel Hampton Big Band.

Since his twenties Mixon has worked continuously with Frank Foster as a pianist for the Big Band; Frank Foster's Loud Minority, and his quartet - the Non-Electric Company.

Mixon plays piano on many recordings. He appears with Hank Crawford on the compact discs Tight and After Dark and has also recorded with The Danny Mixon Trio. His most recent CD is entitled On My Way.

In 2004 Danny Mixon was presented with an award honoring him as a legendary pianist, by the National Jazz Museum in Harlem  from their series “Harlem Speaks” honoring Harlem Heroes. In September 2007 Danny was Honoree at the 18th Annual Legends Purple Carpet Awards, honoring contributors of the promotional arts and entertainment industry at Brooklyn's Toro's.

Danny Mixon was also the musical director of the Lenox Lounge in Harlem, where he also regularly played with the Danny Mixon Trio, until it closed in 2012.

Danny Mixon performed with Antoinette Montague at Marcus Garvey Park's Charlie Parker Jazz Festival 2016 in New York City, and several others venues in 2016 New York City.

Selected discography

As leader
 Mixin' With Mixon (Cinderella, 1983)
 Building Bridges (2004)
 On My Way (2003)
 Pass It On (2015)

With The Piano Choir
Handscapes (Strata-East, 1974)

As sideman
With Betty Carter
 Betty Carter (Bet-Car Productions, 1976)
With Hank Crawford
Tight (Milestone, 1996)
After Dark (Milestone, 1998)
With Charles Mingus

 Cumbia & Jazz Fusion (Atlantic, 1978)

With Dannie Richmond
Ode to Mingus (Soul Note, 1979)
With Pharoah Sanders

 Live in Paris (1975) (Lost ORTF Recordings) (Transversales Disques, 2020)

With Joe Lee Wilson

 Without A Song (Inner City Records, 1978)

References

Sources
 
 
 
 
 

1949 births
African-American pianists
American jazz pianists
American male pianists
American jazz bandleaders
Musicians from New York City
Living people
20th-century American pianists
Jazz musicians from New York (state)
21st-century American pianists
20th-century American male musicians
21st-century American male musicians
American male jazz musicians
20th-century African-American musicians
21st-century African-American musicians